Parthenina monicae is a species of sea snail, a marine gastropod mollusk in the family Pyramidellidae, the pyrams and their allies.

Distribution
This marine species occurs off Vietnam.

References

 Saurin, E. 1958. Pyramidellidae de Pho-Hai (Sud Viêt-Nam). Annales Faculté des Sciences (Saigon) 1958: 63−86, pl. 1−4

External links
 To World Register of Marine Species

Pyramidellidae
Gastropods described in 1958